In Greenlandic Inuit religion, a  (or  in Inuktitut syllabics) was an avenging monster fabricated by a practitioner of witchcraft or shamanism by using various objects such as animal parts (bone, skin, hair, sinew, etc.) and even parts taken from the corpses of children. The creature was given life by ritualistic chants. It was then placed into the sea to seek and destroy a specific enemy.

Because  were made in secret, in isolated places and from perishable materials, none have been preserved. Early European visitors to Greenland, fascinated by the native legend, were eager to see what  looked like, so the Inuit began to carve representations of them out of sperm whale teeth.

Today,  of many different shapes and sizes are carved from various materials such as narwhal and walrus tusk, wood and caribou antler. They are an important part of Greenlandic Inuit art, and are highly prized as collectibles.

Publicity versus secrecy 
The making of a  started most often at night, in secrecy. The magic consequences of situations of concealment, and the neutralizing effect of public confession was believed also in several other areas of life, thus, this is an example of the more general topic of secrecy versus publicity.

Concealment 
Concealment or secrecy was believed to create magic consequences in several areas of life:

 Concealed miscarriage or infanticide could give birth to a monster called .
 A concealed breach of taboo could bring harm on the community.
 Secrecy was also preliminary for the functioning of so-called formulae (texts or songs used like an charm or spell when in danger, need, hunting, and in practical everyday situations).

Neutralizing effect of public confession 
Concealment was seen as a preliminary for several magical effects. If this was broken, unintentionally or intentionally, the effect could lose its power.

  in some groups resolved the consequence of taboo breach by achieving public confession of the breacher.
 Animals killed in the course of hunting were believed to have souls as well as humans, and efforts were taken to please and avoid the revenge of hunted animals. The first kill of a young boy would be "neutralized" by public ritual, in which each adult member of the community had to make an incision into the head of the game, or eat a piece from it. Thus, the belief was that public and communal partaking in a dangerous act reduced and neutralized the danger.

Meanings of the same term in various Inuit cultures 

Igloolik
The  was an invisible ghost. Only the shaman could notice it. It was the soul of a dead person, which became restless because the breach of some death taboo. It scared game away from the vicinity. Thus, the shaman had to help by scaring it away with a knife.

Caribou Inuit
The  was also an invisible being. It was a chimera-like creature, with human head and parts from different species of animals. It was dangerous, it could attack the settlement. Then, the shaman had to combat it and devour it with their helping spirits.

Greenland
The  was manifested in the real, human-made object. It was made by people to the detriment of their enemies. It was a puppet-like thing, but was thought of have magical power onto the victim. It might be made from mixed parts of dead animals and dead children.

Copper Inuit

See also
 Anchimayen
 Tikoloshe

References

Bibliography

Further reading
 
 

Inuit mythology
Inuit legendary creatures
American witchcraft
Greenlandic culture
Inuit art
Mythological monsters
Ivory works of art